Prihova is a settlement on the left bank of the Savinja River immediately north of Nazarje in Slovenia. The area belongs to the traditional region of Styria and is now included in the Savinja Statistical Region.

References

External links
Prihova on Geopedia

Populated places in the Municipality of Nazarje